Jonathan Alberto Hansen (born 10 September 1988) is an Argentine footballer currently playing for Liga FPD side Sporting San Jose.  He has played in Argentina, Ecuador, Honduras, Guatemala, Costa Rica and Mexico.

Career
Born in Sunchales, Hansen began playing football in Quilmes Atlético Club's youth system. He began his professional career with Quilmes, but has played almost exclusively outside of his native Argentina since.

Hansen joined Alebrijes de Oaxaca in January 2017, scoring a goal on his Ascenso MX debut against Club Celaya.

References

External links

1988 births
Argentine footballers
Argentine expatriate footballers
Living people
Association football forwards
Quilmes Atlético Club footballers
Club Atlético Acassuso footballers
Real C.D. España players
C.D. Suchitepéquez players
S.D. Quito footballers
C.S. Herediano footballers
Alebrijes de Oaxaca players
C.S.D. Municipal players
Alianza Universidad footballers
C.S. Cartaginés players
Primera Nacional players
Primera B Metropolitana players
Ecuadorian Serie A players
Ascenso MX players
Liga FPD players
Liga Nacional de Fútbol de Guatemala players
Peruvian Primera División players
Argentine expatriate sportspeople in Ecuador
Argentine expatriate sportspeople in Mexico
Argentine expatriate sportspeople in Costa Rica
Argentine expatriate sportspeople in Guatemala
Argentine expatriate sportspeople in Peru
Expatriate footballers in Ecuador
Expatriate footballers in Mexico
Expatriate footballers in Costa Rica
Expatriate footballers in Guatemala
Expatriate footballers in Peru
Sportspeople from Santa Fe Province